A Swiss travel document is a paper allowing travel by political refugees and foreigners living in Switzerland with B (Right to Stay) or C (permanent resident) permits who do not have national passports. The holder of a travel document for refugees or passport for foreigners is allowed to return to Switzerland during the period of validity of the document (as long as the residence permit or provisional admission granted before the start of the journey has not expired in the meantime). The refugee travel document does not entitle the holder to visit his State of origin or provenance (art. 8 para. 3 ODV).
 
The period of validity of a refugee travel document and passport for foreigners is 5 years (art. 9 ODV)- 3 years for children who had not reached age 3 when the document was issued.

References
 Documents suisses de voyage pour étrangers

Refugee travel documents
Law of Switzerland